Erbessa mitys is a moth of the family Notodontidae first described by Herbert Druce in 1899. It is found in Brazil, French Guiana and Venezuela.

References

Moths described in 1899
Notodontidae of South America